Makkhali Gosala (Pāli; BHS: Maskarin Gośāla; Jain Prakrit sources: Gosala Mankhaliputta) or Manthaliputra Goshalak was an ascetic teacher of ancient India. He was a contemporary of Gautama Buddha, the founder of Buddhism, and of Mahavira, the last and 24th Tirthankara of Jainism.

Sources 
Details about Gosala's life are sparse. All of the available information about Gosala and about the Ājīvika movement generally comes from Buddhist and Jain sources. As Gosala's teachings appear to have been rivals of those of the Buddhist and Jain leaders of his day, this information is regarded by most scholars as being overtly influenced and coloured by sectarian hostilities.

Two primary sources describe Gosala's life and teaching: the Jain Bhagavati Sutra, and Buddhaghosa's commentary on the Buddhist Sammannaphala Sutta. The Bhagavati Sutra goes into detail about the career of Makkhali Gosala and his relationship with Mahavira; the Sammannaphala Sutra itself mentions Makkhali in passing as one of six leading teachers of philosophy of the Buddha's day, and Buddhaghosa's commentary provides additional details about his life and teaching.

Early life 
According to the Bhagavati Sutra, Gosala was born in the village of Saravana, a name meaning 'thicket of reeds'. His mother's name is given as 'Bhadda', a name used in many Jaina sources to refer to the unknown mother of some mythological figure, while his father's name is given as Mankhali. Gosala's father was said to be employed as a mankha, a somewhat obscure class of mendicant or ascetic that seems to have been occupied with carrying an image of a god or goddess, and with singing religious songs.

The name 'Gosala' literally means 'cow shed', and both the Bhagavati Sutra and Buddhaghosa claim that Gosala was so named because he was born in a cow shed, his parents being unable to find more suitable lodgings in the village of Saravana. The Bhagavati Sutra reports that Gosala went on to follow his father's profession, becoming a mankha. Meanwhile, Buddhaghosa claims that Gosala was born into slavery, and became a naked ascetic after fleeing from his irate master, who managed to grab hold of Gosala's garment and disrobe him as he fled. While it is possible that the broad outlines of Gosala's birth story or early life are correct—that he was born into poverty in a cowshed—it may be equally likely that these versions of his early life were concocted by Buddhist and Jain partisans to bring a rival teacher into disrepute.

The philosopher's true name seems to have been Maskarin, the Jaina Prakrit form of which is Mankhali and the Pāli form Makkhali. "Maskarin" is explained by Pāninī (VI.i.154) as "one who carries a bamboo staff" (maskara). A Maskarin is also known as Ekadandin. According to Patañjali (Mahābhāsya iii.96), the name indicates a School of Wanderers who were called Maskarins, not so much because they carried a bamboo staff as because they taught "Don't perform actions, don't perform actions, quietism (alone) is desirable to you". The Maskarins were thus fatalists or determinists.

Makkhali Gosala and Mahavira
The Bhagavati Sutra states that Gosala became Mahavira's disciple three years after the start of Mahavira's asceticism, and travelled with him for the next six years. A commentary to the Jain Avasyaka Sutra provides details of these six years of association, many of them reflecting poorly on Gosala- another likely indication of sectarian bias. Several incidents in the narrative show Mahavira making predictions that then come true, despite Gosala's repeated attempts to foil them. These incidents were likely included in the narrative to provide motivation for Gosala's later belief in the inevitability of fate. Some of these incidents may in fact have been adapted from Ajivika sources but recast by Jaina chroniclers.

Another possible adaptation of an Ajivika story is found in Mahavira's explanation of the end of the association between himself and Gosala, recorded in the Bhagavati Sutra. On coming to a plant by the roadside, Gosala asked Mahavira what the fate of the plant and its seeds would be. Mahavira stated that the plant would grow to fruition, and the seed pods would grow into new plants. Determined to foil his master's prediction, Gosala returned to the plant at night and uprooted it. Later, a sudden rain shower caused the plant to revive and re-root itself. Upon approaching the plant again later, Gosala claimed to Mahavira that he would find his prophecy to have been foiled. Instead, it was found that the plant and its seeds had developed exactly as predicted by Mahavira. Gosala was so impressed by the reanimation of the plant that he became convinced that all living things were capable of such reanimation. The terms used in the story of the Bhagavati Sutra for reanimation mimic a technical term for reanimation of the dead that is also found elsewhere in Ajivika doctrine. Mahavira disagreed with this thesis, and this seems to have been the cause of the separation of the two ascetics. Mahavira is, however, later depicted as having rescued Gosala from an attack by an enraged renunciant using magical powers acquired through the practice of austerities; this is claimed to motivate Gosala's pursuit of the same sort of magical powers.

Death
A. L. Basham dates the death of Gosala in 484 BC on the basis of Mahavamsa.

In literature
Gosala appears briefly as a "cameo" character in the 1981 Gore Vidal novel Creation, a fictional account of the Persian Wars of the 5th century BC, told from the perspective of a widely travelled Persian diplomat, Cyrus Spitama, who is depicted as the grandson of Zoroaster and boyhood friend of Xerxes I. In early adulthood, thanks to his facility with languages, Cyrus is appointed by King Darius I as the Persian ambassador to the kingdoms of India. While travelling across the Subcontinent, Cyrus stops at the city of Mathura, where he is accosted by the Jain sage, who lectures Cyrus about his views on the inevitability of fate, and his disagreements with Mahavira.

'Khanti Kikatia' is a novel focused on the life of Makkhali Gosala, written by Ashwini Kumar Pankaj in the Magahi language.<ref>Ashwini Kumar Pankaj, Khanti Kikatia: A Novel based on life and thought of Makkhali Goasala (Pyara Kerketta Foundation, 2018)</ref>

References
Citations

Sources
  
  originally published by Luzac & Company Ltd., London, 1951.
 
 Ñāṇamoli, Bhikkhu (trans.) and Bodhi, Bhikkhu (ed.) (2001). The Middle-Length Discourses of the Buddha: A Translation of the Majjhima Nikāya. Boston: Wisdom Publications. .
 Thanissaro Bhikkhu (trans.) (1997). Samaññaphala Sutta: The Fruits of the Contemplative Life (DN 2). Available on-line at http://www.accesstoinsight.org/tipitaka/dn/dn.02.0.than.html.
 Walshe, Maurice O'Connell (trans.) (1995). The Long Discourses of the Buddha: A Translation of the Dīgha Nikāya''. Somerville: Wisdom Publications. .

External links 
Makkhali Gosala – Buddhist perspective

6th-century BC Indian philosophers
Date of birth unknown
Date of death unknown
Spiritual teachers
Indian slaves
Ancient slaves